Baron Otto Grote zu Schauen (25 December 1636 O.S. / 4 January 1637 N.S. – 5/15 September 1693) was a Hanoverian statesman.

He was born in Sønderborg (Duchy of Schleswig), and came from a noble lineage. After the Thirty Years' War, he studied at the University of Helmstedt and the University of Leiden and then went traveling.

From 1665, he was privy councilor and chamberlain of initially Johann Friedrich, Duke of Brunswick-Lüneburg, and then the duke's younger brother and successor, Ernest Augustus, Elector of Hanover.

He died in Hamburg in the midst of negotiations with Denmark over Saxe-Lauenburg. Gottfried Wilhelm Leibniz wrote a couplet on his death.

References 
 
 
 Deutsche Biographische Enzyklopädie, vol. 4, S. 201.
 Wilhelm Rothert, A. Rothert, M. Peters (ed.): Hannoversche Biographie, vol. 3: Hannover unter dem Kurhut, 1646 - 1815, 1916, .

1637 births
1693 deaths
People from the Electorate of Hanover
People from Sønderborg Municipality